Bardo, False Chronicle of a Handful of Truths, or simply Bardo, is a 2022 Mexican epic black comedy-drama film co-written, co-scored, edited, produced, and directed by Alejandro G. Iñárritu. The film stars Daniel Giménez Cacho alongside Griselda Siciliani, and follows a journalist/documentarian who returns to his native country of Mexico and begins having an existential crisis in the form of dreamlike visions. The title refers to the Buddhist concept bardo, a liminal state between death and rebirth. It is Iñárritu's first film to be fully filmed in Mexico since Amores perros  in 2000.

Bardo premiered at the 79th Venice International Film Festival in competition for the Golden Lion on September 1, 2022, and was released in theaters on November 18, 2022, then streamed on Netflix on December 16, 2022. The film received mixed reviews from critics, who praised the performances, cinematography, and direction, but criticized the writing and runtime. It received a nomination for Best Cinematography at the 95th Academy Awards.

Plot
Silverio Gama is a Mexican journalist turned documentary filmmaker living in Los Angeles with his wife, Lucía, and teenage son, Lorenzo. His work has become increasingly personal and subjective as he has grown older; his latest film, False Chronicle of a Handful of Truths, is a work of docufiction with autobiographical elements. Silverio and Lucía are happy together, but they are haunted by the death of their first son, Mateo, a day after his birth. The two keep Mateo's ashes and feel unable to move on from his loss. Silverio experiences much of his day-to-day life in surreal fashion, with dreams, memories, and fantasies playing out alongside his activities. When he meets America's ambassador to Mexico at Chapultepec Castle, for instance, he envisions the events of the 1847 Battle of Chapultepec and the suicides of the Niños Héroes around him.

Silverio learns that he will be the first Latin American to receive a prestigious American award for journalism. He speculates that he is only receiving the award to ease tensions between the United States and Mexico (inflamed by negative perceptions of U.S.–Mexico migration as well as Amazon's attempts to purchase the Mexican state of Baja California), but nevertheless tries to deal with a wave of media scrutiny in his home country. He cancels an interview on a popular talk show at the last minute, reminisces about his time as a husband and father, and tries to strike a balance between attacking the problems he sees with the Mexican state and defending its people from stereotypes. Secretly, he feels guilty over emigrating to the U.S. when so many other Mexicans cannot leave.

Silverio and his family attend a party held in his honor. He reunites with his siblings and extended family, to whom he is indifferent, and his adult daughter, Camila, who he lavishes with attention. When the talk show host scathingly criticizes Silverio's work, the filmmaker responds by insulting the host personally. Silverio eventually flees into the restroom, where he imagines reconciliations with his deceased father and mother. When he leaves his mother's apartment, he sees symbolic representations of historic atrocities in Mexico: hundreds of people signifying those kidnapped or killed by organized crime collapse in a commercial district, and Hernán Cortés sits atop a pile of corpses in the Zócalo, lecturing Silverio about the indigenous genocide.

Before travelling back to Los Angeles, Silverio and his family vacation in Baja California, just as Amazon buys the state. Camila tells Silverio that she will quit her job in Boston to move back to Mexico, which Silverio tentatively welcomes. The family decide to scatter Mateo's ashes in the ocean before leaving for the U.S., where they are treated with contempt by a Hispanic-American customs official.

After Lorenzo reminds him of a time when his pet axolotls died, Silverio buys some as a surprise gift. On the L.A. Metro ride from the pet store (in a repeat of an earlier scene), Silverio has a violent stroke and is left unattended on the train for several hours. He languishes in a coma, and it is revealed that the events of the film so far have been his comatose brain's attempts to process his life experience. Camila accepts the award in Silverio's absence, and she and his other family members and friends sit by his bedside, holding conversations and playing songs or television broadcasts that have inadvertently affected his dreams.

In a near-featureless desert within his mind, Silverio reunites with his dead family members and ignores projections of his living family. He sees a copy of himself, which mirrors his movements for a short time before walking away. The film ends as it began, with Silverio imagining himself flying through the desert. It is unclear if he has died, reawakened, or learned to live with his baggage.

Cast
 Daniel Giménez Cacho as Silverio Gama
 Diego Tello de Meneses as 11 year old Silverio
 Griselda Siciliani as Lucía Gama
 Ximena Lamadrid as Camila Gama
 Iker Sanchez Solano as Lorenzo Gama
 Jay O. Sanders as Ambassador Jones
 Andrés Almeida as Martín
 Francisco Rubio as Luis
 Rubén Zamora as Silverio's brother
 Mar Carrera as Lucero
 Fabiola Guajardo as Tania
 Daniel Damuzi as Antonio
 José Antonio Toledano as Juan Escutia
 María Cobar as Niece
 Fernanda Borches as Presenter

Production

Development
On March 22, 2020, it was reported that Alejandro G. Iñárritu would write, direct and produce a new film, to be shot in Mexico, Bradford Young as cinematographer, and Patrice Vermette as production designer. On March 9, 2021, Griselda Siciliani joined the cast, with Grantham Coleman that July.

Filming
Principal photography began on March 3, 2021 in Mexico City, with Darius Khondji as cinematographer and Eugenio Caballero as production designer, under the working title Limbo. Khondji paired the large format Alexa 65 camera with Panavision Sphero lenses, shooting almost the entirety of the film on the 17mm and the 21mm.  Five months of filming were planned in other locations in the Capital and the Estudios Churubusco.

On March 4, 2021, during filming in the historic center of Mexico City, a passerby was arrested for striking a production security member. In September 2021, it was reported that the film had completed production.

Post-production
Iñárritu continued editing the film after its premiere. The version that screened at the 70th San Sebastián International Film Festival in late September 2022 runs 152 minutes without credits, 22 minutes shorter than the one screened at Venice and Telluride. The final runtime was set at 160 minutes (including credits).

Release
Bardo, False Chronicle of a Handful of Truths had its world premiere at the 79th Venice International Film Festival on September 1, 2022. It had its United States premiere at the 2022 AFI Fest on November 3, 2022. It was released in theaters in Mexico on October 27, 2022, then a limited release in United States theatres on November 4 and on Netflix on December 16.

Reception

Critical reception

The film has received polarizing reviews from critics, who praised the performances of Cacho and Siciliani, Khondji's cinematography, and Iñarritu's direction, but criticized the runtime and writing; many referred to the film as "self-indulgent" and "pretentious".  

In an interview with Los Angeles Times, Iñárritu, although not having read any of the reviews, believed their was a racial bias among the critics and stated that a filmmaker's expressions of themselves shouldn't be considered as self-indulgent or emulating other thematically-related works.

Accolades

See also
 List of submissions to the 95th Academy Awards for Best International Feature Film
 List of Mexican submissions for the Academy Award for Best International Feature Film

References

External links
 
 

2022 black comedy films
2022 comedy-drama films
Films shot in Mexico City
Films set in Mexico
Films directed by Alejandro González Iñárritu
Films with screenplays by Alejandro González Iñárritu
Mexican black comedy films
Mexican comedy-drama films
Magic realism films
Spanish-language Netflix original films
2020s Mexican films